Orazi is an Italian surname. Notable people with the surname include:

Angelo Orazi (born 1951), Italian footballer and manager
Manuel Orazi (1860–1934), Italian artist
Orazio Orazi (1848–1912), Italian priest and painter

See also
Orazio

Italian-language surnames